Church of the Immaculate Conception, Immaculate Conception Church, Church of Our Lady of Immaculate Conception or Our Lady of Immaculate Conception Church may refer to:

Azerbaijan 
 Church of the Immaculate Conception, Baku

Bosnia and Herzegovina 
 Immaculate Conception Church (Vidoši), Livno
 Church of Our Lady of Immaculate Conception, Seria

Canada 
 Immaculate Conception Church (Palmer Road), Prince Edward Island
 Immaculate Conception Church (Peterborough, Ontario)
 Church of the Immaculate Conception (Cooks Creek, Manitoba)

China 
 Cathedral of the Immaculate Conception, Beijing
 Cathedral of the Immaculate Conception (Changsha)
 Cathedral of the Immaculate Conception (Hangzhou)
 Church of the Immaculate Conception, Huzhuang, Pingyin County, Jinan, Shandong province
 Church of the Immaculate Conception, Jinan
 Cathedral of the Immaculate Conception (Nanjing)

Croatia 
 Immaculate Conception Church (Vidoši)

Estonia 
 Immaculate Conception Church, Tartu

Germany 
 Maria, Königin des Friedens, Neviges

Hong Kong 
 Cathedral of the Immaculate Conception (Hong Kong)

India 
 Church of Immaculate Conception, Gurgaon, Haryana
 Our Lady of the Immaculate Conception Church, Goa, Panaji, Goa
 Our Lady of Immaculate Conception Church, Manjummel, Kerala
 Our Lady of Immaculate Conception Church, Mt. Poinsur, Borivali, Maharashtra
 Immaculate Conception Church, Urwa, Mangalore

Ireland 
 Church of the Immaculate Conception, Dublin

Italy 
 Church of the Immaculate Conception, Riccia

Malaysia 
 Church of the Immaculate Conception (Johor)
 Church of the Immaculate Conception, Penang

Malta 
 Collegiate Church of the Immaculate Conception, Bormla
 Church of the Immaculate Conception, or Sarria Church, Floriana
 Parish Church of the Immaculate Conception, Ħamrun
 Chapel of the Immaculate Conception, Wied Gerżuma
 Church of the Immaculate Conception, Żurrieq

Morocco 
Church of the Immaculate Conception (Tangier)

Philippines 
 The Immaculate Conception of the Virgin Mary Parish Church, or Baclayon Church, Baclayon, Bohol
Immaculate Conception Parish Church (Balayan), Batangas
Immaculate Conception Parish Church (Concepcion), Tarlac
Immaculate Conception Parish Church (Dasmariñas), Cavite
Immaculate Conception Church (Guagua), Pampanga
Immaculate Conception Parish Church (Jasaan),  Misamis Oriental
Immaculate Conception Parish Church (Los Baños),  Laguna
Immaculate Conception Parish Church (Santa Cruz), Laguna
Immaculate Conception Parish Church (Santa Maria), Bulacan

Portugal 
Our Lady of Conception Parish Church, or Matriz Church of Póvoa de Varzim, Póvoa de Varzim
Church of Our Lady of the Conception, or Church of Nossa Senhora da Conceição Velha, Lisbon
Church of Our Lady of Conception, or Our Lady of the Assumption Cathedral, Santarém

Russia 
 Immaculate Conception Church, Perm
 Immaculate Conception Church, Smolensk

Spain 
Church of the Immaculate Conception, La Línea de la Concepción

Thailand
 Immaculate Conception Church, Bangkok

United Kingdom 
 Church of the Immaculate Conception, Spinkhill, Derbyshire
 Church of the Immaculate Conception, Hartlepool, County Durham
 Church of the Immaculate Conception, Farm Street, London, England
 Church of Our Lady of the Immaculate Conception, Birkenhead, Merseyside
 Our Lady Immaculate Church, Chelmsford, Essex
 Immaculate Conception Church, Clevedon, Somerset
 Immaculate Conception Parish Church, Stratherrick, Inverness-Shire, Scotland

United States

Connecticut
 Immaculate Conception Parish (Connecticut)
 Immaculate Conception Parish, Southington

Kentucky
 Immaculate Conception Catholic Church (Peach Grove, Kentucky)
 Immaculate Conception Church (Hawesville, Kentucky)

Massachusetts
 Immaculate Conception Parish, Indian Orchard
 Immaculate Conception Parish, Springfield

Nebraska
 Immaculate Conception Church and School (Omaha, Nebraska)

New York
 Immaculate Conception Church (Amenia, New York)
 Immaculate Conception Church (Bangall, New York)
 Immaculate Conception Church (Bronx)
 Immaculate Conception Church (Manhattan)
 Immaculate Conception Church (Rochester, New York)
 Church of the Immaculate Conception and Clergy Houses
 Church of the Immaculate Conception (Tuckahoe, New York)
 Church of the Immaculate Conception (Yonkers)

Ohio
 Immaculate Conception Catholic Church (Botkins, Ohio)
 Immaculate Conception Catholic Church (Celina, Ohio)
 Immaculate Conception Church, School, and Rectory, Cincinnati, Ohio
 Immaculate Conception Catholic Church (Fulda, Ohio)
 Immaculate Conception Church (Grafton, Ohio)

Texas
 Immaculate Conception Church (Brownsville, Texas)

Washington
Immmaculate Conception Church (Seattle) (1904), a designated Seattle Landmark
 Church of the Immaculate Conception, Steilacoom Catholic Church, Steilacoom

Elsewhere in the United States
 Immaculate Conception Church (Fairbanks, Alaska)
 Immaculate Conception Church (Jacksonville, Florida)
 Immaculate Conception Catholic Church (Lihue, Hawaii)
 Church of the Immaculate Conception (Chicago), Illinois
 Church of the Immaculate Conception (Saint Mary-of-the-Woods, Indiana)
 Immaculate Conception Church (New Orleans), Louisiana
 Immaculate Conception Church (Iron Mountain, Michigan)
 Church of the Immaculate Conception (St. Anna, Minnesota)
 Immaculate Conception Church and Rectory (St. Louis), Missouri
 Immaculate Conception Church (Sparks, Nevada)
 Church of the Immaculate Conception (Camden, New Jersey)
 Immaculate Conception Catholic Church (Durham, North Carolina)
 Church of the Immaculate Conception (Halifax, North Carolina)
 Immaculate Conception Church (Pawhuska, Oklahoma)
 Former Immaculate Conception Church, Westerly, Rhode Island
 Church of the Immaculate Conception (Rapid City, South Dakota)
 Church of the Immaculate Conception (Knoxville, Tennessee)
 Immaculate Conception Church (Washington, D.C.)

Uruguay 
 Church of the Immaculate Conception, or Iglesia de la Inmaculada Concepción, Rivera

See also 
 Basilica of the Immaculate Conception (disambiguation)
 Cathedral of the Immaculate Conception (disambiguation)
 Church of the Immaculate Conception of the Blessed Virgin Mary (disambiguation)
 Church of Our Lady Immaculate (disambiguation)
 St. Mary of the Immaculate Conception Church (disambiguation)
 Immaculate Conception (disambiguation)